The IMOCA 60 class yacht Aquitaine Innovations,  was designed by Finot-Conq, and launched in June 1996 after being made by its own build team under the name Aquitaine Composites with managed by Thierry Eluère based in France.

Racing results

Construction

Hull Construction
 Bottom of the hull totally monolithique
 Preimpregnated carbon high temperature cured
 Hull stringers are made out of pultruded carbon
 Bulkhead are made of carbon cured in an autoclaves
  
Other Features   
 Rotating wing-mast supported by two deck spreaders both reaching 6,48 m from the centreline (realized with Dassault and CTA, by Alucarbon)
 Reduced foresail
 Vectran shrouds
 Stay of the genoa roller furler in carbon
 Fixed keel with a carbon voile and inox inserts
 Special bulb weighed down by fragments of tungsten

References

1990s sailing yachts
Sailing yachts designed by Finot-Conq
Sailboat type designs by Groupe Finot
Vendée Globe boats
IMOCA 60
Sailboat types built in France